The Women's 4 × 5 kilometre relay cross-country skiing event was part of the cross-country skiing programme at the 1980 Winter Olympics, in Lake Placid, United States. It was the seventh appearance of the women's relay event. The competition was held on 21 February 1980, at the Mt. Van Hoevenberg Recreation Area.

Results

References

Women's cross-country skiing at the 1980 Winter Olympics
Women's 4 × 5 kilometre relay cross-country skiing at the Winter Olympics
Oly
Cross